Nicolás Emanuel Laméndola (born 12 December 1998) is an Argentine professional footballer who plays as a midfielder for Atlético de Rafaela, on loan from Atlético Tucumán.

Career
Laméndola came through the youth ranks at Atlético Tucumán. He was promoted into their senior set-up in early 2020, as he appeared on the substitute's bench for a Primera División home draw with Lanús on 22 February. He didn't come on that day, as he didn't for five further matches across the next year; including for a Copa Sudamericana encounter with Independiente in November. Laméndola's senior debut arrived on 6 March 2021 during a Copa de la Liga Profesional group stage away defeat against Lanús. On 30 May 2022, Laméndola joined Primera Nacional club Atlético de Rafaela on a loan deal until the end of December 2023.

Career statistics
.

Notes

References

External links

1998 births
Living people
Sportspeople from San Miguel de Tucumán
Argentine footballers
Association football midfielders
Argentine Primera División players
Primera Nacional players
Atlético Tucumán footballers